Kresna Gorge Tunnel was a planned twin-tube tunnel in Blagoevgrad Province, Bulgaria. The tunnel would be part of Struma motorway (A3), that runs between Sofia and the border crossing to Greece, at the village of Kulata.

The proposed length of the tunnel of over 15 km would place it among the longest road tunnels in the world. The main reason to build a motorway tunnel of such length was to protect the environment in the Kresna Gorge.

The design works of the tunnel began in 2013. The construction was expected to begin in 2016, using the New Austrian Tunnelling method due to the diverse geology in the Kresna gorge, which makes the usage of TBM inapplicable. The construction costs along with the access roads were estimated at 1.1 billion levs (~560 million euro). As of 2015, plans were abandoned and an alternative route east of the gorge is being considered, which will involve a series of shorter tunnels and viaducts.

References

External links
 Presentation of Kresna Gorge Tunnel at NCSIP, June 2014 (in Bulgarian)
 Alternative Alignments (2011) at NCSIP
 Strategy for Construction (2011) at NCSIP
 Contract for Conceptual Design (29 July 2013) .pdf, at NCSIP (in Bulgarian)

Motorways in Bulgaria
Proposed roads in Bulgaria
Proposed road tunnels in Europe
Proposed transport infrastructure in Bulgaria
Tunnels in Bulgaria